Cameraria, a homonym, may refer to either of two genera of life forms:

Cameraria (moth), a genus of leaf-mining moths
Cameraria (plant), a genus of plants in the dogbane family